The 2021 Bratislava Open was a professional tennis tournament played on clay courts. It was the 2nd edition of the tournament which was part of the 2021 ATP Challenger Tour. It took place in Bratislava, Slovakia between 7 and 13 June 2021.

Singles main-draw entrants

Seeds

 1 Rankings are as of 31 May 2021.

Other entrants
The following players received wildcards into the singles main draw:
  Miloš Karol
  Lukáš Klein
  Alex Molčan

The following player received entry into the singles main draw using a protected ranking:
  Andrey Kuznetsov

The following players received entry from the qualifying draw:
  Duje Ajduković
  Uladzimir Ignatik
  Vít Kopřiva
  Jiří Lehečka

The following player received entry as a lucky loser:
  Lucas Miedler

Champions

Singles

 Tallon Griekspoor def.  Sebastián Báez 7–6(8–6), 6–3.

Doubles

  Denys Molchanov /  Aleksandr Nedovyesov def.  Sander Arends /  Luis David Martínez 7–6(7–5), 6–1.

References

2021 ATP Challenger Tour
2021 in Slovak tennis
June 2021 sports events in Europe